3rd FAI Women's World Hot Air Balloon Championship was 3rd edition of World Hot Air Ballooning Championships for women held in Nałęczów, Poland from August 6 to August 11, 2018. Total of 14 tasks were held. Five flights were cancelled due to the weather conditions from August 9 to August 11.

Daria Dudkiewicz-Golawska from Leszno, Poland became world champion. Nicola Scaife, the world champion of 2014 and 2016 from Hunter Valley, Australia was third.

Final ranking

References

External links 
 FAI profile
 

2018 in air sports
2018 in Polish sport
Ballooning competitions
International sports competitions hosted by Poland